Mulot is a French surname. Notable people with this surname include:

 Claude Mulot (1942–1986), French screenwriter and film director
 Jean-Jacques Mulot (born 1948), French rower
 Louis-Georges Mulot (1792–1872), French engineer and entrepreneur

Surnames of French origin